The Ghana Satellite Earth Station is the largest satellite station in Ghana. The satellite station is situated at Kuntunse, on the Accra - Nsawam Road, a suburb of Accra in the Greater Accra Region. The satellite station has five receiver dishes:
 One main dish
 Two medium dishes
 Two small dishes

The station is managed by Vodafone Ghana, after the Ghana government partnered with the Vodafone telco company.

In 2017 it was announced the 32-meter (105 feet) former communications antenna has begun work as an astronomical radio telescope. The telescope's "first light" science observations included methanol maser detections, pulsar observations and VLBI fringe testing.

References

Telecommunications in Ghana